Ingenieurbüro-Kühlerbau-Neustadt GmbH is a privately owned, medium-size company, specialising in the design and manufacturing of coolers and pyro lines for the production of cement clinker.
The company was founded by Dipl.-Ing. Karl von Wedel in 1982, and is headquartered in Neustadt, Germany. The business has local offices in the Czech Republic, Hong Kong, Brazil, USA, Singapore, and India, and employs over 130 people worldwide.

During 30 years of activity, IKN has altered its business structure from being a cooler specialist to a full range supplier for complete pyro lines.

References

External links 

Construction and civil engineering companies of Germany
Construction and civil engineering companies established in 1982
German companies established in 1982